Marie C. Couvent Elementary was a historic elementary school in New Orleans, Louisiana named for Marie Couvent, an African American former slave who married successful African American businessman Bernard Couvent and deeded property for the Institute Catholique.

The school was built in 1940 in Faubourg Marigny and originally named Marigny Elementary School. It was renamed for Marie Couvent and renamed again in 1997 to A. P. Tureaud Elementary School because the Couvents had slaves.

History
In 1989 Sun Ra performed in front of the school.

In the 1990s a campaign was launched to rename city public schools that venerated slaveholders. Since Couvent and her husband owned slaves, and the school changed its name in 1997 to A. P. Tureaud Elementary School for A.P. Tureaud. Manumission may have been illegal during the era they lived so their options to free people may have been limited.

The school closed in 2013.

References

Public elementary schools in Louisiana
Defunct elementary schools in New Orleans
1940 establishments in Louisiana